Moose Life is a forward-scrolling shoot 'em up game for Microsoft Windows developed by Llamasoft. Similar to past Llamasoft titles like Tempest 2000 and Polybius, the title incorporates influences from classic arcade games of the early 1980s, along with psychedelic visuals and electronic music to create a trance-like effect. It supports virtual reality using Steam VR and PSVR.

Gameplay
The player controls a moose traveling on a forward-facing path with two planes of gameplay at the top and bottom of the screen. Players can move in any direction, but may only shoot forward, and can switch between the two planes of gameplay with a button press. Players can collect sheep, released by destroying a checkered ball, to gain temporary invulnerability and a bonus if they are successfully brought to the end of the stage. Enemies may drop power-ups in the form of pills that grant new abilities or perks. 

The game consists of 50 stages, with pre-defined waves of enemies that appear in a semi-random layout. Like many other Llamasoft titles, it saves the "best" state when a new level is reached, based on the highest number of lives, and allows players to restart from any of these points, rather than starting over every time.

Development and release
Moose Life began as part of a planned follow-up to Minotaur Arcade Vol. 1, using the same voxel-based engine and framework. It was planned as a companion or "B-side" to a new version of Super Ox Wars, but after some promising development Llamasoft decided to shelve Super Ox Wars and focus on Moose Life as a stand-alone title. 

The title was teased by a screenshot release on creator Jeff Minter's twitter on August 21, 2019. Its release was announced shortly before its release on July 30, 2020.

Reception
Hardcore Gamer rated the title 4/5. Eurogamer gave a positive, unscored review, saying "This is a joyous game... As the levels pile up and the gimmicks flow, Moose Life makes me happier and happier."

References

2020 video games
Virtual reality games
Indie video games
Video games developed in the United Kingdom
Llamasoft games
Oculus Rift games
Valve Index games
Shoot 'em ups
Video games with voxel graphics
Windows games
Windows-only games